{{Speciesbox
|image =
|status = EN
|status_system = IUCN3.1
|status_ref = <ref name = iucn>Andriambololonera, S. 2018. Carlephyton madagascariense. The IUCN Red List of Threatened Species 2018: e.T68002459A68006962. https://dx.doi.org/10.2305/IUCN.UK.2018-2.RLTS.T68002459A68006962.en. Accessed on 13 September 2022.</ref>
|genus = Carlephyton
|species = madagascariense
|authority = Jum.
}}Carlephyton madagascariense''' is a plant species in the genus Carlephyton endemic to Madagascar. 

Description
The plant is herbaceous. It differs from the other two species in the genus in that it has some bisexual flowers in between the male and female zones of the spadix. The apex of the spadix can be either sterile or not. 

Range and habitatCarlephyton madagascariense'' is native to the Ankarana area of northern Madagascar. It inhabits dry deciduous forest between 10 and 250 meters elevation. It typically grows in clusters.

The species is known from three locations. Its estimated extent of occurrence (EOO) is over 493 km2, and its minimal estimated area of occupancy (AOO) is 16 km2. Its conservation status is assessed as endangered. It is threatened with habitat loss from deforestation from livestock grazing and subsistence wood harvesting.

References

Aroideae
Endemic flora of Madagascar
Plants described in 1919
Flora of the Madagascar dry deciduous forests